The 1965 New York Mets season was the fourth regular season for the Mets. They went 50–112 and finished tenth and last in the National League. They were managed by Casey Stengel and Wes Westrum. They played home games at Shea Stadium, where they drew 1.77 million paying fans, third in the National League (and over 500,000 more fans than the New York Yankees).

As WOR-TV, the team' television broadcaster, began to be broadcast on cable starting that year via microwave relay thru the WWOR EMI Service throughout much of the Northeastern United States, it made the Mets the first major league team to broadcast its games via satellite to viewers outside its home city. Home and away games were aired on cable to regional viewers in this part of the country.

Offseason 
 November 23, 1964: Warren Spahn was purchased by the Mets from the Milwaukee Braves.
 November 30, 1964: Duke Carmel was drafted from the Mets by the New York Yankees in the 1964 rule 5 draft.
 December 7, 1964: Tracy Stallard and Elio Chacón were traded by the Mets to the St. Louis Cardinals for Gordie Richardson and Johnny Lewis.
 January 15, 1965: George Altman was traded by the Mets to the Chicago Cubs for Billy Cowan.
 April 27, 1965: Yogi Berra signed as a free agent by the Mets.

Regular season 
Former Yankee great Yogi Berra, fired as manager of the Bombers even after he had led them to the American League pennant and into the seventh game of the 1964 World Series, signed with the Mets as player–coach during the off-season. Before managing the 1964 Yankees, his last appearance in a game had been as a pinch hitter in Game 3 of the 1963 World Series on October 5; batting for Jim Bouton, Berra lined out to right field off Don Drysdale. With the 1965 Mets, Berra appeared in only four games, with two starts at catcher, and made two hits in nine at bats. On May 9, 1965, he appeared in his final game as a player, three days shy of his 40th birthday. He then served as the Mets' first-base coach through the  season and proved to be a valuable asset to the team, especially with young talent like Jerry Grote coming up.

Following the 1964 season, the Milwaukee Braves sold pitcher Warren Spahn to the Mets. Braves manager Bobby Bragan predicted, "Spahnie won't win six games with the Mets." Spahn took on the dual role of pitcher and pitching coach in New York but won only four and lost twelve. Spahn was put on waivers on July 15, 1965, and released on July 22, 1965. He immediately signed with the San Francisco Giants, with whom he finished the season.

Wes Westrum had joined the Mets as a coach in 1964 and became pitching coach on July 14, 1965, after Spahn's release. When manager Casey Stengel fell and broke his hip on July 25 while celebrating his upcoming 75th birthday at Toots Shor's in Manhattan, Westrum was named interim manager, a position in which he served until Stengel formally retired on August 30—Westrum then became the team's official manager.

Season standings

Record vs. opponents

Notable transactions 
 April 27, 1965: Yogi Berra was signed as a free agent by the Mets.
 May 17, 1965: Yogi Berra was released as a player by the Mets.
 June 8, 1965: 1965 Major League Baseball Draft
Nolan Ryan was drafted by the Mets in the 12th round.
Don Shaw was drafted by the Mets in the 35th round.
 July 17, 1965: Warren Spahn was released by the Mets.
 July 21, 1965: Jesse Gonder was traded by the Mets to the Milwaukee Braves for Gary Kolb.
 August 5, 1965: Billy Cowan was traded by the Mets to the Milwaukee Braves for players to be named later. The Braves completed the deal by sending Lou Klimchock and Ernie Bowman to the Mets on September 25.

Roster

Player stats

Batting

Starters by position 
Note: Pos = Position; G = Games played; AB = At bats; R = Runs scored; H = Hits; Avg. = Batting average; HR = Home runs; RBI = Runs batted in; SB = Stolen bases

Other batters 
Note: G = Games played; AB = At bats; R = Runs scored; H = Hits; Avg. = Batting average; HR = Home runs; RBI = Runs batted in; SB = Stolen bases

Pitching

Starting pitchers 
Note: G = Games pitched; IP = Innings pitched; W = Wins; L = Losses; ERA = Earned run average; SO = Strikeouts

Other pitchers 
Note: G = Games pitched; IP = Innings pitched; W = Wins; L = Losses; ERA = Earned run average; SO = Strikeouts

Relief pitchers 
Note: G = Games pitched; W = Wins; L = Losses; SV = Saves; ERA = Earned run average; SO = Strikeouts

Farm system

Notes

References 
1965 New York Mets at Baseball Reference
1965 New York Mets team page at www.baseball-almanac.com

New York Mets seasons
New York Mets season
New York Mets
1960s in Queens